Pramuka is an island in the Thousand Islands archipelagic regency in Jakarta which serves as the islands' regency seat.

Demographics 
Ethnic groups on the island are Betawi, Bugis, Bantenese, Javanese, Madura, and Minangkabau.
Facilities on the island include a school, mosque, hospital, dock, and homestay for tourists.<ref>, www.pulaupramuka.com. Retrieved 1 February 2011.</ref>

 Transportation 
This island can be reached in two and half hours by motorboat from Muara Angke Jakarta, or faster by speedboat from Marina Ancol Jakarta. Boat rentals to other islands in the archipelago are also available.

 Conservation 
There is a hawksbill turtle (Erethmochelys imbricata'') conservation in this island. The island coast is planted with mangrove to protect it.

Notable native 
A notable native is the environmental activist Swietenia Puspa Lestari.

References

Thousand Islands Regency
Islands of Java
Landforms of Jakarta
Islands of the Java Sea